Eric Huang (Chinese: 黃鈞耀, pinyin: Huáng Jūn-yào; born in 1973) is a Taiwanese diplomat who worked in missions in the United States, Singapore, Canada, and the Baltic States.

Biography 
Eric Huang graduated from National Taiwan University with a bachelor in International Business and received an Magister degree from the University of Chicago Institute of Business Administration. With the referral of the country's Ministry of Foreign Affairs, he completed the training programs of Harvard and Oxford universities at different times.

He is married and has two children.

Career 

2012–2015 worked at the mission in Singapore, was responsible for bilateral political and free trade agreements.

2016–2018 was the Deputy Director General of the Department of International Cooperation and Economic Affairs of the Ministry of Foreign Affairs of Taiwan.

2018–2020 was the director general of the Taiwan Economic and Cultural Office in Chicago.

In 2020 appointed head of the Taipei mission in Latvia, which he was responsible for relations with Lithuania. in 2021 in November after the establishment of the Taiwanese Representative Office in Lithuania, he became its first head.

See also 
 Ministry of Foreign Affairs (Taiwan)
 Taiwanese Representative Office in Lithuania
 Lithuania–Taiwan relations

References 

1973 births
Living people
Taiwanese people
National Taiwan University alumni